; April 10, 1911 – March 17, 1945) was a Japanese composer of ryūkōka and gunka.

Biography
Shimaguchi was born in 1911 in the village of Kaizuka (today part of the city of Kamogawa), Chiba Prefecture. He was the third son of a family who ran a fishery. Upon finishing elementary school, Shimaguchi moved to Tokyo where, with the assistance of an older brother, he enrolled at a music school.

During his professional career, Shimaguchi was signed exclusively to Nippon Victor, for whom he composed a number of songs which were popularized by the label's singers such as Fujiyama Ichirō, Haida Katsuhiko, and Nitta Hachirō.

After the start of the Pacific War, Shimaguchi was drafted by the Imperial Japanese Navy. He was first deployed to Tateyama Air Base, then later to Iwo Jima. Shimaguchi died on March 17, 1945, during the Battle of Iwo Jima. His remains were never found, but he left behind a pair of incomplete songs, including .

References

1911 births
1945 deaths
20th-century Japanese composers
Japanese male composers
People from Chiba Prefecture
Victor Entertainment artists
Imperial Japanese Navy personnel of World War II
Japanese military personnel killed in World War II
Battle of Iwo Jima
20th-century Japanese male musicians